"Nun of Dat" is a song by American rapper BlocBoy JB featuring rapper Lil Pump. It was released as the only promotional single from BlocBoy's seventh mixtape, Simi, on May 2, 2018.

The song received generally positive reviews, with praise for both of the rappers' verses.

Background 
The track was released as the only promotional single from BlocBoy JB's mixtape Simi. The track is 4 minutes and 1 second long.

Critical reception 
The song received generally positive reviews. Nick Mojica of XXL called the track "hard-hitting", and that Lil Pump "matched BlocBoy JB's intensity". Darryl Robertson of Vibe called the record "fun-filled".

Release history

References 

2018 singles
BlocBoy JB songs
Lil Pump songs
Songs written by Lil Pump
Songs written by Tay Keith